Hernandaline is one of a class of quinoline alkaloids. This compound has been isolated from the stem bark of Hernandia ovigera (Hernandiaceae). Studies have established than hernandaline has hypotensive activity. Its optical rotation is °.

See also 
 Aporphine

References 

Aporphine alkaloids
Phenol ethers
Benzaldehydes